Homecomings is the seventh book in C. P. Snow's Strangers and Brothers series. The events concern the personal life of narrator Lewis Eliot.

Plot synopsis
Following his wife's death, Eliot begins seeing Margaret. Her subsequent, and unsuccessful, marriage to another man leads to a difficult affair.

Reception
In a 1956 book review in Kirkus Reviews summarized the book as "An inordinately objective observer, C. P. Snow's leisurely narrative has a cumulative validity; it is also impressive in its breadth and control."

References

1956 British novels
English novels
Novels by C. P. Snow
British political novels
Macmillan Publishers books